Margaret Tryphena Frances Crang (1910-January 5 or 6 1992)  was a lawyer, teacher, journalist, and political activist. She served as Edmonton city councillor, 1933-1937 and twice ran for provincial office as a leftist candidate.

Crang's election at the age of 23 in late 1933 makes her the youngest ever to be elected to Edmonton city council. In her second term in 1935, she became the first woman to get re-elected onto council and was also appointed deputy mayor under Mayor Joe Clarke. She served two terms on council from 1933 to 1937 under the banner of the Labour Party. During her time in office, Crang advocated for women's rights, labour rights, and anti-fascism.

Controversy arose in 1936, after Crang attended the World Peace Conference in Brussels as a representative of Alberta's League Against War and Fascism. Crang among others secretly traveled to Spain, which was undergoing the Spanish Civil War. At the front lines near Madrid, Crang "went up to the sandbag barricade and, borrowing a rifle, fired two shots for the government side".

As well, her candidacy in a 1936 Edmonton by-election in opposition to an official CCF candidate caused her to be banned from the CCF party and damaged her political fortunes.

Personal life

Early life 
Crang was born in 1910 in Strathcona, Alberta, at the time a separate city from Edmonton. (Her family at the time were living in a house her father had built on the northwest corner of 83 Avenue and 104 Street.) Her parents were Tryphena Crang and Francis Crang. Frank Crang served as Labour Party schoolboard trustee in Edmonton for 25 years. It was her father who inspired Crang's socialist ideologies and her passion for politics.

In her adolescence, Crang was heavily involved in sports and also achieved high academic scores. She was tutored by Harry Ainlay, with whom she later served on council.

Crang obtained three degrees from the University of Alberta: a Bachelors in Arts, Bachelor in Law, and a Diploma in Education. While in University, she took on leadership positions such as secretary for women's athletics.

Political career

1933 municipal campaign 
Crang said she believed that having a woman on city council would greatly benefit Edmonton. In her campaign, Crang argued that Edmonton women needed representation on council and women had a valuable perspective on food and housing due a their experience in domestic labour.

Other campaign promises including pro-labour actions such as increased wages for civic employees, employing cash relief payments and medical attention for unemployed workers, and more resources for former soldiers. She also promised to push for appointment of women onto the relief commission, socialized medicine, public ownership of utilities, and a five-cent streetcar fare.

City Councilor: 1933-1937 
In 1933, Margaret Crang was elected to Edmonton's city council at the age of 23, as a Labour Party candidate. Crang received over 10,000 votes, the second largest vote tally out of 17 council candidates, just behind 62-year old Rice Sheppard. Labour did well in this election, electing four of the five open aldermanic seats and taking a majority of seats on council.

Margaret Crang is the youngest person ever to be elected to Edmonton's city council. She was the second woman to be elected to Edmonton's city council and was the first person born in Edmonton to be elected to that body. She was also the only woman to serve on a city council anywhere in Canada at the time, being identified simply as "Woman Alderman" as far away as Winnipeg.

Crang's re-election to council in 1935 made her the first woman to get re-elected onto Edmonton's City Council. In this election, she was the most popular candidate, taking over 11,000 votes, coming in first place out of all the candidates. In this term, she was appointed as the youngest deputy mayor in Canadian history under Mayor Joseph Clarke.

In 1937, Crang failed to get re-elected for a third term on city council. All Labour Party candidates failed to get re-elected, including her father, Dr. Francis Crang.

Provincial by-elections
Crang ran as candidate in two provincial by-elections. Each time she was not an official CCF candidate, which opened a split between her and that party.

She ran in a June 22, 1936 by-election to fill the seat left empty by the resignation of William R. Howson. Margaret's attempt at a provincial seat failed due to political polarization and vote splitting from left-wing voters. Liberal candidate Walter Morrish took the seat. No Conservative ran in this by-election so Morrish picked up most of the anti-SC votes. Instant-runoff voting was used but as it happened, no votes were transferred as Morrish took a majority of votes on the 1st Count. Crang ran as a candidate for a Alberta Social Credit group and several unemployed organizations. Her former teacher, Harry Ainlay, later mayor of Edmonton, ran under the Co-operative Commonwealth Federation label. Due to this, Margaret Crang and her father were kicked out of the CCF.

Crang ran again in an Edmonton provincial by-election held October 7, 1937. But here too she was unsuccessful. She ran under the Progressive Labour label. Edward Leslie Gray, a Liberal running for the anti-SC "Unity League", took the seat. Like Morrish the previous year, he won with a majority of the votes on the 1st Count.

She failed in her re-election bid for her city council seat in November 1937.

Spanish Civil War controversy 
In 1936, Margaret Crang attended the World Peace Conference in Brussels as a representative of Alberta's League Against War and Fascism. Over 5,000 representatives from 32 countries attended this conference. Representatives came from a variety of groups such as women's clubs, trade unions, veteran and youth groups. The goal of the conference was to discuss the recent Spanish Civil War conflict.

After attending the conference, Crang secretly traveled to Spain, which was undergoing a civil war. Crang wanted to see the effects of fascism in Spain and was inspired by the young armed women she saw at the frontlines called the Milicianas. These women were as young as 17 fighting to preserve the elected republican government against General Francisco Franco's fascist rebels. To show her support for the elected government and the Milicianas, Crang "went up to the sandbag barricade and, borrowing a rifle, fired two shots for the government side".

Controversy back home in Canada erupted for Crang with multiple newspapers such as The Toronto Star, The Edmonton Journal, and The Vancouver Sun shaming and criticizing Crang's involvement in the conflict. The Edmonton Journal responded with a front-page article with the headline "Ald. Miss Crang Leaves Peace Parley To Fire Shots At Rebels Near Madrid". The Toronto Star described Crang's actions as hypocritical because she originally went to Europe to attend a peace conference and left after firing a gun at the fascist rebels. The Vancouver Sun's article summarized Crang's actions as "disloyal to Canada" and were "cruel and inhuman" which made her "unwomanly". Church groups and conservative Canadians were also among the loudest upset groups.

Crang admitted that the incident lead to her losing votes although she never apologized for actions. Crang later changed her story saying that she "wasted two bullets" rather than "shot two bullets".

Post-political career 
After her multiple political defeats in 1937, Crang moved to Montreal to become a journalist for the Montreal Gazette, the same newspaper that called her a communist after her Spanish Civil War controversy.

Crang continued her advocacy after her political career. This including advocating for the civil rights of Chinese and Sikh immigrants. Crang led a motion to allow Rhumah Utendale, a Black nursing student, to study at the Royal Alexandra Hospital. Crang asked that the 1938 hospital board to "approve of the principle of admission to the Nurses Training School of girls irrespective of race and color, providing they meet the cultural, educational, and physical requirements.". The hospital board rejected the motion disallowing Utendale to study at the Royal Alexandra Hospital.

Health issues 
Sometime in the 1930s, Crang was diagnosed with Cushing's Disease. Due to a medical error, both of Crang's adrenal glands were removed, causing her to undergo hormone treatment. Crang was one of the first people to be cured of Cushing's disease through the use of Cortisone.

Death 
The exact date of Crang's death is unknown. She died alone in her Vancouver apartment at the age of 82 on January 5 or 6th in 1992.

Legacy 
There are is no memorial dedicated to the legacy of Margaret Crang in Edmonton. In 2013, there was an approval to name a road and a proposal to name a park in the Edmonton neighborhood Cavanagh.

References 

Wikipedia Student Program
Edmonton city councillors
20th-century Canadian politicians
University of Alberta alumni
Canadian women lawyers
20th-century Canadian women politicians
Women municipal councillors in Canada
20th-century Canadian lawyers
20th-century women lawyers